Deben is a rural locality (an ulus) in Selenginsky District, Republic of Buryatia, Russia. The population was 158 as of 2010. There are 2 streets.

Geography 
Deben is located 81 km south of Gusinoozyorsk (the district's administrative centre) by road. Nur-Tukhum is the nearest rural locality.

References 

Rural localities in Selenginsky District